The First World Konkani Convention was held in Mangalore, Karnataka, India, from 16 to 22 December 1995.

From 16 to 22 December 1995, the First World Konkani Convention was held in Mangalore under the auspices of Konkani Bhasha Mandal Karnatak, Konkani Activist and organiser Basti Vaman Shenoy was its chief convener. Margaret Alva, the then Central Minister was the Hon. Chairman, and K.K.Pai was the Chairman of the Organising Committee. 5000 Delegates from all over the world attended this Convention. The Convention bought together Konkani Speaking People from all regions, Religion, dialect and sub communities. The then Chief Minister of Karnataka H.D. Deve Gowda inaugurated the Convention. The seven days convention consisting of seminars, debates, cultural presentations, exhibition and food festival was a grand success. Basti Vaman Shenoy presented before the gathering of world representatives of Konkani People his dream to establish a permanent entity for the preservation and promotion of Konkani language, art and culture. The convention unanimously gave a mandate to establish World Konkani Centre in Mangalore wide a resolution in the valedictory function of the Convention.

References
First World Konkani Convention, Konkani Language and Cultural Foundation

Konkani
Conventions (meetings)
1995 in India
1995 conferences